Heleni Barjau i Vallmitjana (Barcelona, 1921 - Mexico City, 2000), was a Catalan tenor noted for his recordings of La Traviata and Il trittico with Victoria de los Ángeles. Though born in Spain, he fled to Mexico with his family in 1939. He is professionally known as Carlo del Monte.

References 

1921 births
2000 deaths
Spanish tenors
Spanish emigrants to Mexico